Lake Inari is the largest lake in Sápmi and the third-largest lake in Finland. It is located in the northern part of Lapland, north of the Arctic Circle. The freezing period normally extends from November to early June.

The best-known islands of the lake are Hautuumaasaari ("Graveyard Island"), which served as a cemetery for ancient Sami people, and Ukonkivi ("Ukko's Stone"), a sacrificial place of the ancient inhabitants of the area. There are over 3,000 islands in total.    Trout, lake salmon, Arctic char, white fish, grayling, perch and pike are found in Lake Inari.

It empties northwards through the Paatsjoki at the mouth of the Varangerfjord, which is a bay of the Barents Sea.

The lake depression is a graben bounded by faults active in the Cenozoic.

The name of Lake Inari comes possibly from a Pre-Finno-Ugric substrate language.

On 28 December 1984, a Soviet guided missile crashed into the Lake Inari.

References

External links

Inari
Inari
Inari
Lakes of Inari, Finland